Conflat(s) may refer to:

Rail transport
Conflat (railways), type of flatbed rail wagon (freight car) designed to carry a demountable container

Vacuum Flanges
Conflat (vacuum flanges), used to make an ultrahigh vacuum seal between two pipes

Places
Conflat, an ancient name for the Glasgow suburb of Easterhouse#Easterhouse village and the origin of name Easterhouse